Up a Tree may refer to:
Up a Tree (1930 film), a 1930 comedy film
Up a Tree (1955 film), a 1955 animated short film
 Up a Tree (album), a 1999 Looper album
"Up a Tree" (Adventure Time), a 2012 episode of Adventure Time